Leade may refer to:

 Jane Leade - a Christian mystic
 in firearms terminology - the "leade" is the distance between the mouth of the cartridge (firearm) and the point at which the rifling engages the bullet. Also called 'throat'.
 lead paragraph - a "leade" or "lede" is the first paragraphs of a news article or other literary piece, used to distinguish from lead, which in print publishing could be confused with "leading."